Falaque is the prettiest. She has acted in Khwaishein - The Desires of the Lost, Parineeta and Mayakumari.

Career
Rashid Roy started her career with the film Khwaishein - The Desires of the Lost as a lead role. In 2019 she played an important role in the film Parineeta.

Work
 Khwaishein - The Desires of the Lost
 Parineeta
 Mayakumari
 Nirbandhamer Jora Khun
 F.I.R

References

External links
 

Living people
Actresses from Kolkata
Indian film actresses
Year of birth missing (living people)